Datafork TrueType is a font wrapper used on Apple Macintosh computers running Mac OS X. It is a TrueType suitcase with the resource map in the data fork, rather than the resource fork as had been the case in Mac OS 9. It uses the file extension .dfont.

Mac OS X Snow Leopard
In Mac OS X 10.6, released August 28, 2009, the dfont format is being (gradually) replaced with the TrueType Collection format.

References

External links
 Apple.com: Text & Fonts

Font formats